Mikael Adam bin Muhammad Rafee Michel Lozach or Mikael Adam Lozach, better known as SonaOne is a Malaysian singer-songwriter and actor. He gained recognition through the songs "I Don't Care" with Mal Karmal, "No More" and with rapper Joe Flizzow "Havoc" and "Hello". In 2014, he won an award in the 29th Anugerah Juara Lagu. His song "No More" was awarded the best song in the 21st Anugerah Industri Muzik. It made him a composer who has won two major awards in the same year, with the other being Adnan Abu Hassan.

Early life 
SonaOne was born in Kuantan, Pahang on November 30 1988. His mother, Noorzulaily, a Malaysian dance designer was married to a Frenchman, Michel Lozach. He has lived abroad since the age of two weeks old as his parents worked in a resort, Club Med. Due to the background of his parents, they settled in many places including Spain, France and Japan. At the age of 6, his uncle gave him a gift of a Sony Soundpad which was the first musical instrument he played while attending music classes. While staying in Paris, SonaOne took part in graffiti-painting activities. Returning to Malaysia at age 10, SonaOne studied at a French school and continued his interest in graffiti-painting in Kuala Lumpur. At the age of 12, he started working with production software such as Music 2000 and Project 5, and started Flash and sound-programming with his close friends including the brother of Joe Flizzow. In 2005, the 17-year-old SonaOne attracted Joe Flizzow's interest in making the teenager a protegee. At the time, SonaOne was better known as a graffiti artist rather than a musician. Since then, he started publishing music independently and received attention from artists such as Karmal. He joined a Malaysian musical group called "G.O.D Music - Gentlemen On Dinosaurs" under Kartel Records in 2010, which established him as a musician.

Career 
After joining Kartel, he began using the SonaOne alias as a commercial name. At that time, he pursued productions of mixtape which was well-received by fans through social media platforms. His first mixtape, "Illegal Downloads Vol. 1" was published on April 20, 2010, and was followed by "Illegal Downloads Vol. 2" on April 20, 2011. He then launched another mixtape "Tuna Spaghetti" on November 30, 2010, and gained further recognition with songs like "No Snooze", "Flyer Than Your G6" and "Like a Dream". Through "Tuna Spaghetti", he managed to gather more followers. He was nominated for the Shout Awards! in 2010 for the Hip-hop/Urban category.

His first appearance as an artist was through the "Hip Hop In Asia" program where he joined some of the region's notable rappers such as Sheikh Haikel of Singapore, Micbandits of Brunei, Dandee of Thailand and Thaikoon of USA. SonaOne was also invited to host a documentary program once.

His debut studio album "Growing Up Sucks!" was released on December 9, 2013, which included the English-language song "No More" as the lead single. "Hak Eleh" was released as the second single.

In April 2016, he was invited by singer, Siti Nurhaliza to perform at her concert - Dato 'Siti Nurhaliza & Friends, at National Stadium, Bukit Jalil alongside Joe Flizzow, Faizal Tahir, Hafiz Suip, Cakra Khan, Afgan Syahreza and Anggun.

Discography

Studio albums 
 Growing Up Sucks! (2016)
 THE LOCCDOWN (2020)

Mixtapes 
 Illegal Downloads Vol. 1 (2010)
 Tuna Spaghetti (2010)
 Illegal Downloads Vol. 2 (2011)

Awards and nominations

Controversy
SonaOne has been wounded in the face and head after being attacked by a man at shopping mall Fahrenheit 88 at Jalan Bukit Bintang. He was in the car with two friends before the suspect pulled him out of the car and beat him. He was continued to be beaten until he fell.

References

Malaysian hip hop singers
1988 births
Living people
Malaysian Muslims
People of Breton descent
Malaysian rhythm and blues singers
Malaysian rappers
People from Pahang
Malaysian people of French descent
Malaysian people of Malay descent